The 2012–13 Toronto Maple Leafs season was the 96th season for the National Hockey League (NHL) franchise that was established on November 22, 1917. The regular season was reduced from its usual 82 games to 48 due to a lockout.

Due to the abbreviated 48-game schedule, the Maple Leafs played only teams from their own Eastern Conference. Within their division, they played the Boston Bruins and Buffalo Sabres four times each, and the Montreal Canadiens and Ottawa Senators five times each. The Maple Leafs played all non-divisional Eastern Conference opponents three times each.

Toronto qualified for the playoffs for the first time in nine years and the first time in eight seasons (as the 2004–05 season was not played due to the 2004–05 NHL lockout). The Leafs lost Game 7 in the first round against the Boston Bruins despite holding a 4–1 lead with 11 minutes to go in the third period, though Toronto had battled back from a three games to one deficit just to force the seventh game. The Leafs would not qualify for the playoffs again until the 2016–17 season.

Standings

Schedule and results

Regular season

The Maple Leafs concluded the regular season with the best penalty-kill percentage (88%) Tied with the Ottawa Senators.

|- style="text-align:center; background:#cfc;"
| 1 || 19 || @ Montreal Canadiens || 2–1 || Bell Centre (21,273) || 1–0–0 || 2 || Scrivens (1–0–0)
|- style="text-align:center; background:#fcc;"
| 2 || 21 || Buffalo Sabres || 1–2 || Air Canada Centre (19,475) || 1–1–0 || 2 || Scrivens (1–1–0)
|- style="text-align:center; background:#cfc;"
| 3 || 23 || @ Pittsburgh Penguins  || 5–2 || Consol Energy Center (18,641) || 2–1–0 || 4 || Reimer (1–0–0)
|- style="text-align:center; background:#fcc;"
| 4 || 24 || New York Islanders  || 4–7   || Air Canada Centre (19,125) ||  2–2–0  || 4 || Scrivens (1–2–0)
|- style="text-align:center; background:#fcc;"
| 5 || 26 || @ New York Rangers || 2–5   || Madison Square Garden (17,200) ||  2–3–0 || 4 || Reimer (1–1–0)
|- style="text-align:center; background:#cfc;"
| 6 || 29 || @ Buffalo Sabres || 4–3 (OT) || First Niagara Center (18,801) || 3–3–0 || 6 || Reimer (2–1–0)
|- style="text-align:center; background:#cfc;"
| 7 || 31 || Washington Capitals  || 3–2 || Air Canada Centre (19,374) || 4–3–0 || 8 || Reimer (3–1–0)
|-

|- style="text-align:center; background:#fcc;"
| 8 || 2 || Boston Bruins || 0–1 || Air Canada Centre (19,246) || 4–4–0 || 8 || Reimer (3–2–0)
|- style="text-align:center; background:#fcc;"
| 9 || 4 || Carolina Hurricanes || 1–4  || Air Canada Centre (19,072) || 4–5–0 || 8 || Reimer (3–3–0)
|- style="text-align:center; background:#cfc;"
| 10 || 5 || @ Washington Capitals || 3–2  || Verizon Center (18,506) || 5–5–0 || 10 || Scrivens (2–2–0)
|- style="text-align:center; background:#cfc;"
| 11 || 7 || @ Winnipeg Jets || 3–2  || MTS Centre (15,004) || 6–5–0 || 12 || Reimer (4–3–0)
|- style="text-align:center; background:#cfc;"
| 12 || 9 || @ Montreal Canadiens || 6–0 || Bell Centre (21,273) || 7–5–0 || 14 || Reimer (5–3–0)
|- style="text-align:center; background:#cfc;"
| 13 || 11 || Philadelphia Flyers || 5–2 || Air Canada Centre (19,253) || 8–5–0 || 16 || Reimer (6–3–0)
|- style="text-align:center; background:#fcc;"
| 14 || 14 || @ Carolina Hurricanes || 1–3   || PNC Arena (18,680) || 8–6–0 || 16 || Scrivens (2–3–0)
|- style="text-align:center; background:#cfc;"
| 15 || 16 || Ottawa Senators || 3–0   || Air Canada Centre (19,537) || 9–6–0 || 18 || Scrivens (3–3–0)
|- style="text-align:center; background:#cfc;"
| 16 || 18 || @ Florida Panthers || 3–0   || BB&T Center (17,177) || 10–6–0 || 20 || Scrivens (4–3–0)
|- style="text-align:center; background:#fcc;"
| 17 || 19 || @ Tampa Bay Lightning || 2–4 || Tampa Bay Times Forum (19,204) || 10–7–0 || 20 || Scrivens (4–4–0)
|- style="text-align:center; background:#cfc;"
| 18 || 21 || Buffalo Sabres ||  3–1  || Air Canada Centre (19,473) || 11–7–0 || 22 || Scrivens (5–4–0)
|- style="text-align:center; background:#fcc;"
| 19 || 23 || @ Ottawa Senators || 2–3   || Scotiabank Place (19,499) || 11–8–0   || 22  || Scrivens (5–5–0)
|- style="text-align:center; background:#cfc;"
| 20 || 25 || @ Philadelphia Flyers || 4–2 || Wells Fargo Center (19,645) || 12–8–0 || 24 || Scrivens (6–5–0)
|- style="text-align:center; background:#fcc;"
| 21 || 27 || Montreal Canadiens || 2–5  || Air Canada Centre (19,625) || 12–9–0  || 24  || Scrivens (6–6–0)
|- style="text-align:center; background:#cfc;"
| 22 || 28 || @ New York Islanders || 5–4 (OT)  || Nassau Veterans Memorial Coliseum (9,222) || 13–9–0 || 26  || Reimer (7–3–0)
|-

|- style="text-align:center; background:#cfc;"
| 23 || 4 || New Jersey Devils || 4–2   || Air Canada Centre (19,435) || 14–9–0  || 28  || Reimer (8–3–0)
|- style="text-align:center; background:#cfc;"
| 24 || 6 || Ottawa Senators || 5–4   || Air Canada Centre (19,412) || 15–9–0  || 30  || Reimer (9–3–0)
|- style="text-align:center; background:#fcc;"
| 25 || 7 || @ Boston Bruins || 2–4 || TD Garden (17,565) || 15–10–0 || 30 || Scrivens (6–7–0)
|- style="text-align:center; background:#ffc;"
| 26 || 9 || Pittsburgh Penguins  || 4–5 (SO) || Air Canada Centre (19,418) || 15–10–1 || 31 || Reimer (9–3–1)
|- style="text-align:center; background:#fcc;"
| 27 || 12 || @ Winnipeg Jets || 2–5 || MTS Centre (15,004) || 15–11–1 || 31 || Reimer (9–4–1)
|- style="text-align:center; background:#fcc;"
| 28 || 14 || Pittsburgh Penguins || 1–3 || Air Canada Centre (19,561) || 15–12–1 || 31 || Scrivens (6–8–0)
|- style="text-align:center; background:#ffc;"
| 29 || 16 || Winnipeg Jets || 4–5 (SO)   || Air Canada Centre (19,401) || 15–12–2   || 32  || Reimer (9–4–2)
|- style="text-align:center; background:#cfc;"
| 30 || 20 || Tampa Bay Lightning ||  4–2 || Air Canada Centre (19,433) || 16–12–2   || 34  || Reimer (10–4–2)
|- style="text-align:center; background:#ffc;"
| 31 || 21 || @ Buffalo Sabres || 4–5 (SO) || First Niagara Center (19,070) || 16–12–3 || 35 || Reimer (10–4–3)
|- style="text-align:center; background:#cfc;"
| 32 || 23 || Boston Bruins || 3–2  || Air Canada Centre (19,236) || 17–12–3 || 37  || Reimer (11–4–3)
|- style="text-align:center; background:#ffc;"
| 33 || 25 || @ Boston Bruins  || 2–3 (SO) || TD Garden (17,565) || 17–12–4 || 38  ||  Reimer (11–4–4)
|- style="text-align:center; background:#cfc;"
| 34 || 26 || Florida Panthers || 3–2 || Air Canada Centre (19,379) || 18–12–4 || 40 || Scrivens (7–8–0)
|- style="text-align:center; background:#cfc;"
| 35 || 28 || Carolina Hurricanes || 6–3 || Air Canada Centre (19,236) || 19–12–4 || 42 || Reimer (12–4–4)
|- style="text-align:center; background:#cfc;"
| 36 || 30 || @ Ottawa Senators || 4–0 || Scotiabank Place (20,183) || 20–12–4  || 44 || Reimer (13–4–4)
|-

|- style="text-align:center; background:#fcc;"
| 37 || 4 || Philadelphia Flyers || 3–5 || Air Canada Centre (19,619) || 20–13–4  || 44 || Reimer (13–5–4)
|- style="text-align:center; background:#cfc;"
| 38 || 6 || @ New Jersey Devils || 2–1 || Prudential Center (17,625) || 21–13–4 || 46 || Reimer (14–5–4)
|- style="text-align:center; background:#cfc;"
| 39 || 8 || New York Rangers || 4–3 || Air Canada Centre (19,437) || 22–13–4 || 48 || Reimer (15–5–4)
|- style="text-align:center; background:#ffc;"
| 40 || 10 || @ New York Rangers || 2–3 (SO) || Madison Square Garden (17,200) || 22–13–5  || 49 || Reimer (15–5–5)
|- style="text-align:center; background:#cfc;"
| 41 || 13 || Montreal Canadiens || 5–1 || Air Canada Centre (19,651) || 23–13–5  || 51 || Reimer (16–5–5)
|- style="text-align:center; background:#cfc;"
| 42 || 15 || New Jersey Devils || 2–0 || Air Canada Centre (19,425) || 24–13–5 || 53 || Reimer (17–5–5)
|- style="text-align:center; background:#fcc;"
| 43 || 16 || @ Washington Capitals || 1–5 || Verizon Center (18,506) || 24–14–5 || 53 || Scrivens (7–9–0)
|- style="text-align:center; background:#fcc;"
| 44 || 18 || New York Islanders || 3–5 || Air Canada Centre (19,676) || 24–15–5 || 53 || Reimer (17–6–5)
|- style="text-align:center; background:#cfc;"
| 45 || 20 || @ Ottawa Senators || 4–1 || Scotiabank Place (20,500) || 25–15–5 || 55 || Reimer (18–6–5)
|- style="text-align:center; background:#fcc;"
| 46 || 24 || @ Tampa Bay Lightning || 2–5 || Tampa Bay Times Forum (18,826) || 25–16–5 || 55 || Reimer (18–7–5)
|- style="text-align:center; background:#cfc;"
| 47 || 25 || @ Florida Panthers || 4–0  || BB&T Center (16,484) ||  26–16–5  || 57  || Reimer (19–7–5)
|- style="text-align:center; background:#fcc;"
| 48 || 27 || Montreal Canadiens || 1–4 || Air Canada Centre (19,730) || 26–17–5  || 57 || Reimer (19–8–5)
|-

|- style="text-align:center;"
| Legend:       = Win       = Loss       = OT/SO Loss

Overtime statistics

Playoffs
The Maple Leafs qualified for the Stanley Cup playoffs for the first time since the 2003–04 NHL season in a game against the Ottawa Senators on April 20, 2013. They lost to the Boston Bruins in 7 games in the first round.

|- style="text-align:center; background:#fcc;"
| 1 || May 1 || @ Boston Bruins || 1–4 || TD Garden (17,565) || 0–1 || Reimer (0–1)
|- style="text-align:center; background:#cfc;"
| 2 || May 4 || @ Boston Bruins || 4–2 || TD Garden (17,565) || 1–1 || Reimer (1–1)
|- style="text-align:center; background:#fcc;"
| 3 || May 6 || Boston Bruins || 2–5 || Air Canada Centre (19,746) || 1–2 || Reimer (1–2)
|- style="text-align:center; background:#fcc;"
| 4 || May 8 || Boston Bruins || 3–4 (OT) || Air Canada Centre (19,708) || 1–3 || Reimer (1–3)
|- style="text-align:center; background:#cfc;"
| 5 || May 10 || @ Boston Bruins || 2–1 || TD Garden (17,565) || 2–3 || Reimer (2–3)
|- style="text-align:center; background:#cfc;"
| 6 || May 12 || Boston Bruins || 2–1 || Air Canada Centre (19,591) || 3–3 || Reimer (3–3)
|- style="text-align:center; background:#fcc;"
| 7 || May 13 || @ Boston Bruins || 4–5 (OT) || TD Garden (17,565) || 3–4 ||  Reimer (3–4)
|-

|- style="text-align:center;"
| Legend:       = Win       = Loss

Player statistics
Final stats

Skaters

Goaltenders

Goaltenders

†Denotes player spent time with another team before joining the Maple Leafs. Stats reflect time with the Maple Leafs only.
‡Traded mid-season
Bold/italics denotes franchise record

Transactions
The Maple Leafs have been involved in the following transactions during the 2012–13 season.

Trades

Free agents acquired

Free agents lost

Claimed via waivers

Lost via waivers

Lost via retirement

Player signings

Draft picks

Toronto Maple Leafs' picks at the 2012 NHL Entry Draft, held in Pittsburgh, Pennsylvania on June 22 & 23, 2012.

Draft Notes
 The Toronto Maple Leafs' third-round pick went to the Los Angeles Kings as the result of a June 26, 2010, trade that sent a 2010 third-round pick to the Maple Leafs in exchange for this pick.
 The Toronto Maple Leafs' fourth-round pick went to the New Jersey Devils as the result of an October 4, 2011, trade that sent Dave Steckel to the Maple Leafs in exchange for this pick.
  The Anaheim Ducks' sixth-round pick went to the Toronto Maple Leafs as a result of a June 25, 2011, trade that sent a 2011 sixth-round pick to the Ducks in exchange for this pick.
 The Toronto Maple Leafs' seventh-round pick went to the Calgary Flames as the result of a July 27, 2009, trade that sent Wayne Primeau and a 2011 second-round pick to the Maple Leafs in exchange for Colin Stuart, Anton Strålman and this pick.
  The New York Rangers' seventh-round pick went to the Toronto Maple Leafs as a result of a February 28, 2011, trade that sent John Mitchell to the Rangers in exchange for this pick.

See also
 2012–13 NHL season

References

Toronto Maple Leafs seasons
Toronto Maple Leafs season, 2012-13
Toronto